Philip Charles Urban (born 9 February 1963) is CEO of Mitchells & Butlers, which  runs around 1,700 managed pubs, bars and restaurants throughout the United Kingdom.

Early life
Philip Charles Urban was born in February 1963 in Wood Green. Urban has an MBA and is a qualified management accountant (CIMA). He went to the independent Latymer Upper School.

Career
In September 2015, Mitchells & Butlers issued a profits warning and dismissed CEO, Alistair Darby. He was replaced by Phil Urban, who joined as COO in January having been managing director of Grosvenor Casinos and had previously run Whitbread's pub restaurants division. His basic salary will be £510,000.

References

External links
 Mitchells & Butlers

1963 births
Living people
British chief executives
Mitchells & Butlers
People educated at Latymer Upper School
People from Wood Green